Love in the Shadows (Spanish:Amor en la sombra) is a 1960 Mexican drama film directed by Tito Davison and starring Libertad Lamarque, Yolanda Varela and Enrique Rambal.

Cast
 Libertad Lamarque as Claudia Montes  
 Yolanda Varela as Mariela Morán  
 Enrique Rambal as Octavio Morán  
 Nadia Haro Oliva as Doña Mercedes  
 Tony Carbajal as Patricio 
 Hortensia Santoveña as Rosario  
 Miguel Manzano as Don Alberto  
 Antonio Bravo as Empresario 
 Armando Acosta as Mesero  
 Daniel Arroyo as Hombre en funeral
 Sara Cabrera as Señorita Sarita Hernández, secretaria 
 Jorge Chesterking as Hombre en cabaret 
 Roberto Corell as Amigo del empresario 
 Felipe de Flores as Anunciador cabaret  
 Rafael María de Labra as Reportero 
 Felipe del Castillo as Empleado hotel  
 Enrique Díaz Indiano as Ramón, médico 
 Roy Fletcher as Anunciador cabaret II 
 José Loza as Empleado estudio 
 Chel López as Reportero  
 Alejandra Meyer as Lupita, sirvienta 
 Consuelo Monteagudo as Otilia, sirvienta  
 Guillermo Rivas as Reportero  
 Ángela Rodríguez as Carmen, sirvienta  
 Rafael Torres as Chofer 
 Manuel Trejo Morales as Hombre en camerino

References

Bibliography 
 Emilio García Riera. Historia documental del cine mexicano: 1959-1960. Universidad de Guadalajara, 1994.

External links 
 

1960 films
1960 drama films
Mexican drama films
1960s Spanish-language films
Films directed by Tito Davison
Films scored by Manuel Esperón
1960s Mexican films